Adha Munguleya (born 25 May 1999) is an Ugandan long-distance runner.

In 2017, she competed in the junior women's race at the 2017 IAAF World Cross Country Championships held in Kampala, Uganda. She finished in 18th place. In 2018, she competed in the women's half marathon at the 2018 IAAF World Half Marathon Championships held in Valencia, Spain. She finished in 95th place.

References

External links 
 

1999 births
Living people
Place of birth missing (living people)
Ugandan female long-distance runners
Ugandan female cross country runners
20th-century Ugandan women
21st-century Ugandan women